Diomande or Diomandé is a surname. Notable people with the surname include:

Adama Diomande (born 1990), Norwegian footballer
Aïchata Diomande (born 1984), Ivorian women's basketball player
Ismaël Diomandé (born 1992), Ivorian footballer
Ismaël Diomandé (born 2003), Ivorian footballer
Lassina Diomandé (born 1979), Ivorian footballer
Mé Aboubacar Diomandé (born 1988), Ivorian footballer
Olivier Diomandé (born 1974), French-born Ivorian rugby union player
Souleymane Diomandé (born 1992), Ivorian footballer
Vamouti Diomande (born 1991), Ivorian footballer